The Lancaster Brewing Company is a brewery and pub located in Lancaster, Pennsylvania, that produces beer and serves food. The brewery produces over 20 different beers throughout the year. Lancaster Brewing Company beer can be found throughout the Mid-Atlantic region, with distribution in Pennsylvania, New Jersey, New York, Washington, D.C., Delaware, Maryland, Virginia, and West Virginia. The brewery and the restaurant are located in the Edward McGovern Tobacco Warehouse, which was listed on the National Register of Historic Places in 1990.

See also
 Beer in the United States

References

External links
 Lancaster Brewing Company

Companies based in Lancaster, Pennsylvania
Culture of Lancaster, Pennsylvania
Beer brewing companies based in Pennsylvania
1840 establishments in Pennsylvania
American companies established in 1840
Food and drink companies established in 1840